Andrés Felipe Mercado Cepeda (born August 27, 1986, in Barranquilla, Colombia) is a Colombian actor and singer best known for playing Daniel Esquivel in Grachi. While going to school, he began study piano, painting and singing. In his childhood Mercado appeared in different television commercials.

Biography 
After working with acting tutors, Mercado decided to settle in New York for a year to have better training in areas such as improvisation and body awareness. He then returned to Colombia and continued his career as an actor, coming back to music for perfecting his vocal performance. He began his career at age 15 in the Colombian series Padres e hijos as Leonardo Pava. In 2005 he had a small role in El pasado no perdona, together with Wen Benamor. In 2006 he participated in the Colombian version of the telenovela Floricienta, in the role of Richie. In 2007 and 2008 he played Andrés Larrea in Pocholo. In 2009 and 2010 he was Iker in the Mexican telenovela Atrévete a soñar, along with Colombian actor Lucas Velázquez and Danna Paola.

He starred in the Nickelodeon Latin America production Grachi, as Daniel Esquivel, with Cuban actress Isabella Castillo.

Filmography

Awards

References

External links 
 

21st-century Colombian male singers
1989 births
Living people
Colombian male television actors
Colombian male telenovela actors
People from Bogotá